Rodrigo Morales may refer to:

 Rodrigo Morales (footballer, born March 1994), Argentine midfielder
 Rodrigo Morales (footballer, born August 1994), Venezuelan defender or midfielder